KKC may refer to:

 Kahn-Kalai conjecture, a mathematical problem in the field of probability
 Karnataka Knowledge Commission, a Karnatakan governmental body
 Kennedy–King College, a public two-year community college in Chicago, Illinois, United States
 Khon Kaen Airport (IATA code: KKC), a Thai military/public airport
 The Kingkiller Chronicle, a fantasy trilogy by Patrick Rothfuss
 Klynveld Kraayenhof & Co., a Dutch accountancy firm
 Kohn, Kohn & Colapinto, a Washington, D.C. law firm
 Krispy Kreme Challenge, an annual charity event
 Krispy Krunchy Chicken, an American chain of fried chicken fast food restaurants
 Kulture Kiari Cephus, daughter of Cardi B and Offset (rapper)